The Defence Avionics Research Establishment (DARE) is a laboratory of the Indian Defence Research and Development Organisation (DRDO). Located in Bangalore, Karnataka, India, It is one of the two DRDO laboratories involved in the research and development of airborne electronic warfare and mission avionics systems.

History
The organisation was established in 1986 as a Project Laboratory, then named "Advanced Systems Integration and Evaluation Organisation" (ASIEO). Dr. K. G. Narayanan headed ASIEO from its inception till 2002.

On 1 June 2001, ASIEO became a full-fledged DRDO laboratory and was renamed as Defence Avionics Research Establishment (DARE). The current director of DARE, since 2015, is K. Maheswara Reddy.

Areas of work 
DARE works on development of electronic warfare systems and mission avionics for aircraft. It is one of the two laboratories of DRDO that works on electronic warfare systems, along with Defence Electronics Research Laboratory.

ASIEO developed the first mission computer for Light Combat Aircraft in 1991. The computer was responsible for managing the interaction between avionics, displays, sensors and weapon systems. It also developed a self-protection suite for the aircraft that included radar warning receiver, laser warning receiver, jammer, missile approach warning system, and countermeasure dispensers under a program named Mayawi in collaboration with Elisra. Sukhoi Su-30MKI uses Tarang Mk 2 radar warning receiver developed by DARE and manufactured by Bharat Electronics Limited. Its mission computer, radar processor and indication management computer were also developed by DARE and manufactured by Hindustan Aeronautics Limited's Hyderabad division. In 2006, DARE partnered with EADS's defence electronics division to develop a missile approach warning system for the Indian Air Force based on the latter's AN/AAR-60 system. The jointly developed system was put into trials in 2008 and was planned to be co-produced with Alpha Technologies. DARE has also partnered with Elisra to jointly develop electronic warfare systems for Indian and Israeli aircraft. DARE developed an electronic warfare suite for upgraded MiG-29 UPG named D-29.

DARE has worked with Hindustan Aeronautics Limited to develop avionics for upgrade programs for several Indian Air Force aircraft. It participated in the development of a mission computer for SEPECAT Jaguar and in the development of navigation and electronic warfare systems for Mikoyan MiG-27M. DARE, in collaboration with Centre for Airborne Systems and Defence Electronics Research Laboratory, developed antennas for electronic warfare support measures and communication systems of DRDO AEW&CS. DARE also developed a unified electronic warfare suite with an integrated radar jammer and a radar warning receiver for HAL Tejas. The system was flown on a prototype aircraft, PV-1.

References

External links 
 DARE Home Page

Defence Research and Development Organisation laboratories
Research institutes in Bangalore
Research institutes established in 1986
1986 establishments in Karnataka